Janusz Aleksander Ziółkowski (6 April 1924, in Sosnowiec – 5 April 2000) was a Polish sociologist and politician. He was a professor of sociology at the Adam Mickiewicz University in Poznań, and briefly (in 1981) its rector. He was a Solidarity activist and participated in the Polish Round Table Agreement. He was elected a senator (1989–1991), and from 1991 to 1995 he was the Chief of The Chancellery of the President of the Republic of Poland.

1924 births
2000 deaths
People from Sosnowiec
Polish sociologists
Solidarity (Polish trade union) activists
Members of the Senate of Poland 1989–1991